Paraguay–Peru relations are foreign relations between Paraguay and Peru. Both countries established diplomatic relations on May 2, 1858. Paraguay has an embassy in Lima. Peru has an embassy in Asuncion, and an honorary consulate in Ciudad del Este.

Both countries are full members of the Rio Group, of the Latin Union, of the Association of Spanish Language Academies, of the Organization of American States, of the Organization of Ibero-American States and of the Union of South American Nations.

See also 
 Foreign relations of Paraguay
 Foreign relations of Peru
 List of ambassadors of Peru to Paraguay

References

External links
 Paraguayan embassy in Lima (in Spanish only)
 Peruvian Ministry of Foreign Relations about the relation with Paraguay (in Spanish only)
  Peruvian embassy in Asuncion (in Spanish only)

 

 
Peru
Paraguay